The 1972 UTEP Miners football team was an American football team that represented the University of Texas at El Paso in the Western Athletic Conference during the 1972 NCAA University Division football season. After a 1–5 start to the season, eighth-year head coach Bobby Dobbs resigned and was replaced with offensive coordinator Tommy Hudspeth. The Miners then ended the season with one win and three more losses and finished with an 2–8 record.

Schedule

References

UTEP
UTEP Miners football seasons
UTEP Miners football